The 1941 TCU Horned Frogs football team was an American football team that represented Texas Christian University (TCU) in the Southwest Conference (SWC) during the 1941 college football season. In their eighth season under head coach Dutch Meyer, the Horned Frogs compiled a 7–3–1 record (4–1–1 against conference opponents), lost to Georgia in the 1942 Orange Bowl, and outscored opponents by a total of 162 to 135. The Frogs played their home games in Amon G. Carter Stadium, which is located on the TCU campus in Fort Worth, Texas.

Schedule

References

TCU
TCU Horned Frogs football seasons
TCU Horned Frogs football